Pir Muhammad Aminul Hasnat Shah (born 11 December 1952) is a Pakistani politician who served as Minister of State for Religious Affairs and Interfaith Harmony, in Abbasi cabinet from August 2017 to May 2018. Previously he served as the Minister of State of Religious Affairs and Inter-faith Harmony from 2013 to 2017 in third Sharif ministry. He had been a member of National Assembly of Pakistan from June 2013 to May 2018. He is the son of Justice Shaykh Muhammad Karam Shah al-Azhari, a Sunni Barelvi leader and author of famous Tafseer Tafsir Zia ul Quran.

Early life
He was born on 11 December 1952.

Political career
Shah was elected to National Assembly of Pakistan as a candidate of Pakistan Muslim League (N) from Constituency NA-64 (Sargodha-I) in 2013 Pakistani general election.

In June 2013, he was made the minister of state of Religious Affairs and Inter-faith Harmony. He had ceased to hold ministerial office in July 2017 when the federal cabinet was disbanded following the resignation of Prime Minister Nawaz Sharif after Panama Papers case decision.

Following the election of Shahid Khaqan Abbasi as Prime Minister of Pakistan in August 2017, he was inducted into the federal cabinet of Abbasi. He was appointed as the Minister of State for Religious Affairs and Interfaith Harmony. Upon the dissolution of the National Assembly on the expiration of its term on 31 May 2018, Shah ceased to hold the office as Minister of State for Religious Affairs and Interfaith Harmony.

Shah joined the Pakistan Tehreek-e-Insaf (PTI) on 21 January 2023 in a press conference in his hometown of Bhera.

References

Pakistani Muslims
Pakistan Muslim League (N) MNAs
Government ministers of Pakistan
Living people
1952 births
Pakistani MNAs 2013–2018

Barelvis